Catorce is a municipality in San Luis Potosí in central Mexico. The municipal seat is the pueblo mágico of Real de Catorce.

References

Municipalities of San Luis Potosí